Hubert (Duke) Cook (January 22, 1933 – April 10, 2005) was a Canadian football player who played for the Calgary Stampeders. He played college football at Trinity University and Oklahoma State University. He lived in Oklahoma City.

References

1933 births
2005 deaths
Players of American football from Oklahoma
American football centers
Canadian football offensive linemen
American players of Canadian football
Trinity Tigers football players
Oklahoma State Cowboys football players
Calgary Stampeders players
People from Woodward County, Oklahoma